General Count   was a general in the Imperial Japanese Army, and 5th Governor-General of Taiwan from 11 April 1906 to May 1915.

Biography
Sakuma was born in Abu District, Nagato Province (present day Hagi, Yamaguchi), as the younger son of Okamura Magoshichi, a samurai of Chōshū Domain, and was later adopted into the Sakuma family. He studied Western military science under Ōmura Masujirō and was a company commander defending the domain against the Second Chōshū expedition mounted by the Tokugawa shogunate in 1866. He subsequently served in the Boshin War of the Meiji restoration with distinction at the Battle of Aizu. In 1872, he entered the fledgling Imperial Japanese Army as a captain.

In February 1874, Sakuma participated in the suppression of the Saga Rebellion, during which time he led a column of troops from Kumamoto Castle. He then participated in the Taiwan Expedition of 1874, where on May 22 he commanded the 150 strong force of soldiers that was ambushed by aborigines, initiating the Battle of Stone Gate.  During the Satsuma Rebellion, he was commander of the IJA 6th Infantry Regiment. He was promoted to colonel in 1878.  In February 1881, Sakuma was promoted to major general in command of the Sendai military district.

In May 1885, Sakuma was given command of the IJA 10th Infantry Brigade and promoted to lieutenant general the following year. The same year, 1886, he was elevated to the title of danshaku (baron) under the  kazoku  peerage system.

With the outbreak of the First Sino-Japanese War, Sakuma commanded the IJA 2nd Division at the Battle of Weihaiwei, and later served as Japanese military governor of Weihaiwei in Shandong Province, China. At the end of the war, he was awarded the Grand Cordon of Order of the Rising Sun, and elevated to shishaku (viscount).

In 1898, Sakuma was appointed commander of the central division of the Imperial Guards, and became a full general. After a brief period on leave, he then became commander of the Tokyo Garrison. In April 1906, after his appointment as 5th Governor-General of Taiwan, Sakuma was awarded the Order of the Rising Sun (1st class with Paulownia Blossoms, Grand Cordon), and in 1907 was elevated to hakushaku (Count).

With the end of armed resistance by Taiwan's Han Chinese population, the colonial authorities turned their attention to the suppression of the mountain dwelling aboriginal tribes. One of the reasons Sakuma was selected to head the colonial government was due to his participation in Japan's previous 1874 campaign, and his mission extended Japanese control into the aboriginal regions. During his tenure, Sakuma led several armed campaigns against the Atayal, Bunun and Truku peoples. Sakuma was one of the longest-serving governor-generals of Taiwan, stepping down in 1915, after having successfully completed his pacification campaign. He was highly regarded for helping develop Taiwan's east coast, especially the port of Hualien, and the Taroko Gorge area.

He is also credited with introducing baseball to Taiwan in 1910.

After his death, he became a kami under State Shinto, and a shrine was erected in his honor in Sagamihara, Kanagawa Prefecture, and in Taihoku (present-day Taipei). The shrine in Japan still exists, and unsuccessful efforts have been made to reconstruct the one in Taiwan as well.

Decorations
 1882 –  Order of the Rising Sun, 3rd class
 1887 –  Order of the Rising Sun, 2nd class
 1895 –  Grand Cordon of the Order of the Rising Sun
 1906 –  Order of the Rising Sun with Paulownia Flowers

See also
 Taiwan under Japanese rule

References

External links

 Home page for Sakuma Jinja, Kanagawa Prefecture

Footnotes

Japanese generals
Japanese military personnel of the First Sino-Japanese War
People from Chōshū domain
People of the Boshin War
Kazoku
Governors-General of Taiwan
1844 births
1915 deaths
People of Meiji-period Japan
Grand Cordons of the Order of the Rising Sun
Recipients of the Order of the Paulownia Flowers
People of the Satsuma Rebellion
Military personnel from Yamaguchi Prefecture